Walter M. Calinger (born January 2, 1940) is a former lawyer, former mayor of Omaha and education official.

Political career
Walter Calinger was a member of the Omaha City Council and served as the 45th mayor of Omaha, Nebraska from April 20, 1988 to June 5, 1989. He was appointed by the city council after the death of Mayor Bernie Simon. Prior to serving on the City Council and as Mayor of Omaha Calinger was a member and elected twice as president of the Omaha Broad of Education.

Education career
Calinger has a PhD in Education from Ohio State University (1970) and a J.D. from Creighton University (1977).

He has worked the large majority of his career in the education sector beginning as a math teacher and guidance counselor. He was employed by the Norton City School District in Summit County, Ohio, from 1998 to 2005, where he was superintendent from 2002 to 2005.  While there, the district achieved an Excellent rating in 2003 from the Ohio Department of Education for the first time ever. It has retained that rating since.

Calinger worked for the Richmond Heights (Ohio) School District from 2005 to 2008. In his first year, the district improved five points on the Ohio Achievement Test. And the following year improved one more point. During that time, the RHEA  entered into a teachers' strike that lasted for four weeks.

When Walter Calinger was hired by Woodland Hills School District outside Pittsburgh, his claims of past accomplishment was discussed by the  Pittsburgh Tribune-Review reporter Brian Bowling. The article begins, "The new superintendent for Woodland Hills School District says he significantly raised test scores and closed the achievement gap between black and white students at a suburban Cleveland district."

In his position as superintendent (2008–2011) of the Woodland Hills School District, Calinger challenged the public charter school Propel, about how the School District's test results compared with the Propel charter school.  His statement was disputed by the Pittsburgh Post-Gazette education reporter Eleanor Chute,:

Calinger strongly denied the accuracy of the Chute statement.  "She did not at all deal with the requirement of the law setting up charter schools.  It was that law and the charter schools failure to meet its requirements that Calinger was challenging."  Calinger continued to make public statements about school data in an op-ed he published in the Post-Gazette in October, 2010.

Law career
Calinger was a practicing lawyer in Nebraska until his law license was suspended by the Nebraska Supreme Court on December 1, 1995.  According to the ruling, Calinger neglected his duties in a worker's compensation case, resulting in the client losing the case, but, in fact, Calinger had, with the Defendant's approval, transferred her case to her present attorney and his partner, some three months  before the critical date,  when he ceased full-time practice and became Mayor of Omaha. They did not properly enter the case.  The original client had obtained a default judgment in her suit against Calinger while he was in Chile and thus he could not assert several valid defenses.   She did not serve the claim. Calinger, as Plaintiff, brought an action to set aside the default judgement in the Iowa District Court for Montgomery County wherein the pleadings and testimony show that he was living openly in Santiago, Chile and was, in fact, contacted by TV reporters, newspaper reporters and other United States citizens including his parish priest from Omaha while he was living in Chile. At case No. EQCV019068 on June 8, 2004, the default judgement was set aside.  The defendant appealed to the Iowa Supreme Court and the case was heard by the Iowa Court of Appeals which on August 23, 2006 at (No. 6-215/05-00421) affirmed the decision of the District Court.  His license is current.

References

Mayors of Omaha, Nebraska
1940 births
Living people